Xinqiao is a railway station on the Jinshan railway in Songjiang District, Shanghai. It opened for intercity passenger service on September 28, 2012. The station serves Xinqiao, Shanghai.

Since 10 August 2019, the station functions as the eastern terminus of line  of the Songjiang Tram.

References 

Railway stations in Shanghai
Railway stations in China opened in 2012
Stations on the Jinshan railway